Baricheh-ye Enayat (also Romanized as Barīcheh-ye ‘Enāyat and Bereycheh-ye ‘Anāyat; also known as Abū Seleyb Khān-e Kūchek, Barījeh-ye ‘Enāyat, Bereyḩeh-ye ‘Enāyat, and Berīcheh) is a village in Gheyzaniyeh Rural District, in the Central District of Ahvaz County, Khuzestan Province, Iran. At the 2006 census, its population was 23, in 4 families.

References 

Populated places in Ahvaz County